Takeshi Asami (born June 21, 1962) is a Japanese race car driver. In both 1997 and 2001 he competed in the GT300 class of All Japan Grand Touring Car Championship, and he also spent two seasons in Japanese Formula Three from 1995 until 1996.

External links 
 JGTC 1997
 Race Driver Database: Takeshi Asami - Speedsport Magazine
 Takeshi Asami - Complete Archive - Racing Sports Cars

1962 births
Japanese racing drivers
Living people